Aballay can refer to:

 Alejandro Aballay, American biologist
 Roberto Aballay, an Argentine football player
 Aballay, a 1978 short story by Antonio Di Benedetto
 Aballay (film), a 2010 Argentine film based on Di Benedetto's short story